Tokluca or Cevze is a village in the Savur District of Mardin Province in Turkey. The village had a population of 349 in 2021. The hamlet of Mentera is attached to the village.

It is populated by Arabs who are part of the adjacent Kurdish Dereverî tribe. Mentera has a Kurdish population.

References 

Villages in Savur District
Arab settlements in Mardin Province
Kurdish settlements in Mardin Province